Funny Man is a 1994 British comedy horror film written and directed by Simon Sprackling.

Plot
When Max Taylor (Benny Young) wins the ancestral home of Callum Chance (Christopher Lee) in a game of poker, little does he realize that the game is far from over. Max Taylor chooses to ignore Chance's ominous warning and moves into the house within days. After moving into the ancestral home with his family the nightmare begins after Max spins a wheel of chance, (a wheel with four parts, two saying win, and two saying lose). It lands upon lose, and this awakens a demonic creature that lives in the soil of the ancestral home. Soon, one by one, Max's family are murdered by this strange creature known as the Funny Man (Tim James), a Mr. Punch-like jester with a varied and imaginative repertoire of homicidal techniques and a highly irreverent sense of humor. This sense of humor is shared with the audience. He is the only character that addresses the audience directly, as in a pantomime.

He kills off Max's wife and both kids in gruesome yet humorous ways. Max's son being the 1st, after walking around a pillar in circles playing with Funny Man, he stops and is killed off screen. After, Funny Man changes his voice to sound like Max's son and talk Max's wife while looking at her through a key hole, he is then seen dragging the child's body away and telling the audience "when hosting a party, it's always good to put the little ones down first." Max's wife is beaten to death with a club after failing to escape an endless room. Max's daughter is killed while playing a Game Boy after Funny Man hooks jumper cables up to her head, electrocuting her to death to the point where she catches fire.

Meanwhile, Max's brother, Johnny Taylor (Matthew Devitt), is on his way to the mansion with a bunch of hitchhikers who will be lucky to survive the night. Among the hitchhikers is a voodoo woman (Pauline Black) who after using tarot cards later learns about the awakening of the Funny Man. At first, after arriving at the ancestral home, everything seems fine. But the Funny Man has made his targets, and his evil game has begun. It soon becomes a Scooby-Doo Rock'n'Roll madhouse with bizarre scenes, gruesome kills and many humorous moments.

Cast
 Tim James as Funny Man
 Christopher Lee as Callum Chance
 Benny Young as Max Taylor
 Matthew Devitt as Johnny Taylor
 Ingrid Lacey as Tina Taylor
 Jamie Heard as Jamie Taylor
 Harry Heard as Harry Taylor
 Pauline Black as Psychic commando
 Rhona Cameron as Velma Fudd
 Ed Bishop as Card Player

Awards
Funny Man was nominated at the Fantasporto in 1995 for the International Fantasy Best Film Award.

References

External links
 

1994 films
British comedy horror films
1990s comedy horror films
1994 horror films
Horror films about clowns
Supernatural slasher films
1994 comedy films
British films about revenge
British slasher films
Demons in film
British supernatural horror films
British exploitation films
Films set in country houses
British splatter films
1990s English-language films
1990s British films